Below is a list of holidays in Mauritania.

Public holidays

References 

Mauritanian culture
Mauritania
Holidays
Mauritania